This article lists the orders, made by airlines and other buyers, and the operators for the Bombardier CRJ family of regional aircraft.
Produced by Bombardier Aerospace, aerospace division of the Canadian aerospace and defence company Bombardier Inc. and owned by Mitsubishi Aircraft Corporation the former CRJ100 and CRJ200 series are no longer in production but still in active airline service, while the more recent CRJ700, CRJ900 and CRJ1000 series are in production and in service.

Orders and operators

CRJ100/CRJ200
Deliveries and operators sortable, presorted by customer
 Ord — number of aircraft ordered from Bombardier
 Del — number of aircraft delivered by Bombardier
 Opr — number of aircraft in operation with specified airline

CRJ700/CRJ900/CRJ1000
Deliveries and operators sortable, presorted by customer
 Ord — number of aircraft ordered from Bombardier
 Del — number of aircraft delivered by Bombardier
 Opr — number of aircraft in operation with specified airline

See also
 Bombardier CRJ family of regional jets
 Bombardier CRJ200 series (CRJ100, CRJ200)
 Bombardier CRJ700 series (CRJ700, CRJ900, CRJ1000)

References

External links

 Bombardier Aerospace
 Bombardier CRJ website 
 

CRJ orders
CRJ
Bombardier CRJ
Bombardier CRJ